Cubley is a civil parish in the Derbyshire Dales district of Derbyshire, England.  The parish contains twelve listed buildings that are recorded in the National Heritage List for England.  Of these, one is listed at Grade I, the highest of the three grades, and the others are at Grade II, the lowest grade.  The parish contains the settlements of Great Cubley and Little Cubley, and the surrounding countryside.  The listed buildings consist of houses, cottages and associated structures, a church and memorials in the churchyard, farmhouses, and a village pump.


Key

Buildings

References

Citations

Sources

 

Lists of listed buildings in Derbyshire